Municipal elections were held across Latvia on 5 June 2021. This was the first election after the Saeima passed a municipal reform in 2020 that reduced the 110 municipalities and 9 cities to 43 municipalities, including 11 state cities and added 5 new Latvian towns: Ādaži, Iecava, Ķekava, Koknese, and Mārupe. In total, 645 councilors were elected to 40 municipal councils across the country. The 60 seats in the Riga City Council is not up for election until 2025, as snap elections were held in August 2020.

On 28 May, following the decision of the Constitutional Court of Latvia that declared a part of the municipal reform about the inclusion of Varakļāni Municipality into the new Rēzekne Municipality unconstitutional, the Central Election Commission (CEC) cancelled elections in the municipalities of both Rēzekne and Madona. The Saeima decided on 1 June to reverse the decision of the CEC and to move forward with the elections in Madona Municipality on 5 June as initially scheduled.

Electoral system 
All 645 councilors were elected using open-list proportional representation with a 5% electoral threshold. Seats are allocated using the Webster/Sainte-Laguë method. The number of councilors a given municipality were to elect was determined by the Central Election Commission based on the number of residents in that municipality.

Participating parties

Results

Daugavpils

Jelgava

Jūrmala

Liepāja

Rēzekne

Ventspils

Notes

References

External links 
 2021 election hub on the Central Election Commission website (in English)

Local elections in Latvia
2021 in Latvia
Latvia